G. D. Mantell was the tenth Surveyor General of Ceylon. He was appointed in 1894, succeeding P. C. H. Clarke, and held the office until 1896. He was succeeded by F. H. Grinlinton.

References

M